The women's tournament of basketball at the 2017 Summer Universiade in Taipei, Taiwan, began on August 21 and ended on August 28.

Teams 

 The United States was represented by the University of Maryland, College Park.

Preliminary round

Group A 

|}

Group B 

|}

Group C 

|}

Group D 

|}

Classification round

Quarterfinal round

9th–16th place

Semifinal round

13th–16th place

9th–12th place

5th–8th place

Final round

15th place game

13th place game

11th place game

9th place game

7th place game

5th place game

Championship playoffs

Quarterfinals

Semifinals

Bronze medal game

Gold medal game

Final standings

References 
 

2017
Women
2017 in Taiwanese women's sport
2017 in women's basketball
International women's basketball competitions hosted by Taiwan
Maryland Terrapins women's basketball